Ahamus is a genus of moths of the family Hepialidae.

Species 
 Ahamus altaicola
 Ahamus alticola (disputed)
 Ahamus anomopterus
 Ahamus carna (disputed)
 Ahamus gangcaensis
 Ahamus jianchuanensis
 Ahamus lijiangensis
 Ahamus luquensis
 Ahamus macilentus
 Ahamus maquensis
 Ahamus menyuanicus
 Ahamus sichuanus
 Ahamus yulongensis
 Ahamus yunlongensis
 Ahamus yunnanensis
 Ahamus yushuensis
 Ahamus zadoiensis
 Ahamus zhayuensis

External links
 , 2010: Revision of taxonomic system of the genus Hepialus (Lepidoptera: Hepialidae) currently adopted in China. Journal of Hunan University of Science & Technology (Natural Science Edition) 25 (1): 114-120.

Hepialidae
Moth genera